General elections were held in Sudan between 13 and 23 December 2000 to elect a President and National Assembly. The elections were boycotted by the main opposition parties including the Umma Party, the Democratic Unionist Party and the Popular National Congress, which accused the government of vote rigging. Only Omar al-Bashir’s National Congress Party and a small number of minority parties contested the elections.

About 66% of Sudan’s eligible voters cast ballots. Al-Bashir received 86.5% of the votes cast for a five-year presidential term. Former President Jaafar Nimeiry, who had returned to Sudan from exile in Egypt, polled 9.6% of the vote, and three other candidates received less than 4 percent among them. Voters also elected 275 members of the National Assembly to four-year terms. The ruling NCP won all but 10 seats; no other party contested 112 of the seats. Of the 90 specially selected positions, 35 went to women, 26 to university graduates, and 29 to trade union representatives. Women constituted about 10 percent of the legislature’s membership. An Organisation of African Unity observer team concluded “that the overall exercise was an important step towards democratization and that it was conducted in a conducive atmosphere and in a satisfactory manner.” Political parties that boycotted the elections had a decidedly different view.

Results

Presidential election

National Assembly

References

Sudan
General
Elections in Sudan
National Legislature (Sudan)
Presidential elections in Sudan
Election and referendum articles with incomplete results